Hypecoum is a genus of flowering plants in the family Papaveraceae, found in temperate areas of northern Africa, Europe and Asia. The lectotype is Hypecoum procumbens.

Species
Species currently accepted by The Plant List are as follows: 
Hypecoum aegypitacum (Forssk.) Asch. & Schweinf.
Hypecoum aequilobum Viv.
Hypecoum alpinum Z.X. An
Hypecoum dimidiatum Delile
Hypecoum erectum L.
Hypecoum ferrugineomaculatum Z.X. An
Hypecoum imberbe Sm.
Hypecoum leptocarpum Hook. f. & Thomson
Hypecoum littorale Wulfen
Hypecoum pendulum L.
Hypecoum procumbens L.
Hypecoum pseudograndiflorum Petrovič
Hypecoum torulosum Å.E.Dahl
Hypecoum trilobum Trautv.
Hypecoum zhukanum Lidén

References

Papaveraceae genera
Plants described in 1753
Taxa named by Carl Linnaeus